, is a Japanese light novel series written by Keishi Ayasato and illustrated by Ruroo. Enterbrain has published 2 volumes under their Famitsu Bunko imprint since March 2013.

Summary

Characters

Terminology 
Devil of the Cellar (Arist Craisi)

Monster with no Name (Gurauen) 

Territory 

Tamawarimono 

The Hustle and Bustle of December 

Dramatis personae

Volume list

References

External links 
 Arist Craisi | FBonline

2013 Japanese novels
Light novels
Famitsu Bunko